Pusia zebrina is a species of small sea snail, marine gastropod mollusk in the family Costellariidae, the ribbed miters.

Description

Distribution

References

 Nordsieck, F. (1975). Conchiglie delle Isole Canarie. Parte 2. La Conchiglia. 75-76: 3-7, 22.
page(s): 5-6

External links
 Orbigny, A. D. d'. (1836-1842). Mollusques, Echinodermes, Foraminifères et Polypiers recueillis aux Iles Canaries par MM. Webb et Berthelot. In: Barker-Webb, P. & Berthelot, S. (eds) Histoire naturelle des Iles Canaries
 Gould, A. A. (1850). (descriptions of new species of shells from the United States Exploring Expedition). Proceedings of the Boston Society of Natural History. 3: 151-156, 169–172, 214-218, 252–256, 275–278, 292–296, 309–312, 343–348.
 [httpseeve, L. A. (1844-1845). Monograph of the genus Mitra. In: Conchologia Iconica, or, illustrations of the shells of molluscous animals, vol. 2, pl. 1-39 and unpaginated text. L. Reeve & Co., London]://biodiversitylibrary.org/page/8937231 

zebrina
Gastropods described in 1840